Arvigna is a commune in the Ariège department in the Occitanie region of southwestern France.

The inhabitants of the commune are known as Arvignais or Arvignaises.

Geography
Arvigna is a commune in the Pre-Pyrenees located some 11 km south-east of Pamiers and 12 km west by south-west of Mirepoix. Access to the commune is by the D12 road from Vira in the south-west passing through the commune east of the village and continuing to join the D119 north of the commune. There are extensive forests in the commune covering about 40% of the land area with the rest farmland.

The Douctouyre river flows along the edge of the forests in the north-east of the commune from south-east to north and it continues north to join the Hers near Vals. Four streams rise in the commune and flow north-east to join the Douctouyre in the commune - the Ruisseau de Lafage, the Ruisseau de Truffet, an unnamed stream, and the Ruisseau de Minguet. The western border is delineated by an unnamed stream which flows north to join Le Canal south of Saint-Amadou.

Places and Hamlets
The population is mostly split between four hamlets (Languit, Menet, Roubichou, les Bordes) which are scattered around the Town hall and the school. The church is on the slopes of Cantegril hill above Arvigna village. There are eight other hamlets in the commune:

Le Castel
Marty
Minguet
Monge
Peres
Le Pioy
La Rose
Le Soula
En Terraine

Neighbouring communes and villages

Heraldry

Administration

List of Successive Mayors

Demography
In 2017 the commune had 223 inhabitants.

Sites and Monuments
There are four structures registered as historical monuments in Arvigna. These are:
War memorial (20th century). This memorial is located inside the walls of the church.
Funeral Chapel of the Barrière family (19th century)
Wayside Cross at Roubichou (1813)
Parish Church of Saint-Vincent and Saint-Martial (14th century).

The Church of Saint-Vincent and Saint-Martial contains many items that have been registered as historical objects. These are:

Funeral Cross of Father Louis Richard (20th century)
Cemetery Cross (19th century)
The surroundings of the war memorial including the large statues of Saint Joan of Arc and Saint Germaine of Pibrac with their Corbels (20th century)
2 Altar Towers (19th century)
Cape and Cloth of Gold (19th century)
4 sides of the processional dais (19th century)
Exhibition veil of the sacremental saint: IHS (19th century)
Processional banner: Baby Jesus blessing the world (19th century)
Baptismal fonts and a sculpture of the baptism of Christ (19th century)
Secondary Altar of the Virgin, Altar tombstone, Altar seating, Tabernacle, and small statue: Virgin of the Sacred Heart (19th century)
Harmonium (19th-20th century)
Main Altar, Altar tombstone, Altar seating, and Tabernacle (19th century)
Collection plate (17th century)
Stoup: 3 anthropomorphic heads (17th century)
Stoup (on a footing) (17th century)
Family pew (19th century)
Sacristy furniture (17th century)
4 Funeral candlesticks (19th century)
Altar Cross: Christ on the cross (17th century)
Chalice with its Paten (20th century)
Solar Monstrance (19th century)
Mortuary cloth: with deaths-heads insignia (19th century)
Mortuary cloth (19th century)
Aube (19th century)
Paddle: IHS (19th century)
Paddle: IHS (18th century)
Statuette: Virgin and child (18th century)
Pair of paintings: Saint Vincent and Saint Martial (19th century)
Altar table with its frame: Calvary St. Peter and St. Martial (17th century)
4 Stained glass windows (19th century)
The Church furniture
4 paintings on the processional dais (19th century)

Local life, tourism and associations

Local life
School: an inter-communal educational grouping (RPI) for the Douctouyre Valley groups together the communes of Arvigna, Calzan, Vira, [Dun], Lieurac, and Carla-de-Roquefort. Five classes are open, including one at Arvigna with a canteen service and a CLAE. There is a leisure centre that operates on Wednesdays and during the holidays at Dun.

Tourism
There are two rural Gîtes (apartments), a Hiking or Mountain bike trail 7 km long trail which is an Earth Society (maquisards and guerrillas) path starting from the hamlet of Minguet to the site of a former Cathar castle (not restored).

Associations

The Festival Committee organises various annual events, local festivals and fireworks. It includes many people from the commune and elsewhere, young and old.
Hunting Association
Walking group: Les Caminaïres

See also
Communes of the Ariège department

References

External links
 Arvigna on the old National Geographic Institute website 
Arvigna on Géoportail, National Geographic Institute (IGN) website 
Arvigna on the 1750 Cassini Map

Communes of Ariège (department)